Red Arrow may refer to:

Biology
 A species of dragonfly, Rhodothemis lieftincki
 The red arrow crab Stenorhynchus yangi

Business
 Red Arrow Diner, a diner in the U.S. state of New Hampshire
 Red Arrow Entertainment Group, the content, production, and distribution division of ProSiebenSat.1 Media
 Red Arrow Products Company LLC, a food flavor manufacturer operating as a subsidiary of Kerry Group
 Red Arrow TV rental, former Granada plc subsidiary

Entertainment
 "Red Arrow", a finishing maneuver popularized by the English professional wrestler Neville (currently using the stage name Pac)
 Formerly the superhero guise of Roy Harper, a DC Comics character, formerly known as Speedy and Arsenal, before going back to using the code name Arsenal following the death of his daughter
 Emiko Queen, also known as Red Arrow, half-sister of the DC Comics superhero Green Arrow (Oliver Queen)
 Briefly suggested as a code name for herself by the Arrowverse character Thea Queen
 Red Arrow (Middle-earth), a summoning device in Tolkien's fictional universe
 Red Arrow, an aircraft featured in the Thunderbirds episode "Edge of Impact"

Military
 “Red Arrow Division“, nickname and insignia of the 32nd Infantry Division (United States), active 1917 – 1919 and 1940 – 1946
 Common name of Chinese anti-tank missiles,  Hongjian, 红箭, abbreviated as HJ, includes
 HJ-8
 HJ-9
 HJ-10
 HJ-12

Transportation
 A Traffic-light signalling and operation traffic signal
 Red Arrow (bus), express bus services in central London
 Red Arrow (bus), bus service between Nottingham and Derby, UK
 Red Arrow (PRR train), a train on the Pennsylvania Railroad between Detroit and New York City
 Red Arrow (Japanese train), an express train of Seibu Railway, Japan
 Red Arrow (Russian train), a Russian express sleeper train running between Moscow and Saint Petersburg
 Red Arrow (Swiss train), a Swiss double railcar train built in the 1930s
 Frecciarossa (Italian for RedArrow), the brand name for 300-350 km/h Italian high speed trains
 Red Arrow Motorcoach, a long-distance bus company in Alberta, Canada, part of Pacific Western
 Red Arrow Highway, a portion of U.S. Route 12 in Michigan named for the 32nd Infantry Division
 A business name for the interurban services of the defunct Philadelphia Suburban Transportation Company (PSTCo) now operated by the Southeastern Pennsylvania Transportation Authority (SEPTA) as SEPTA Routes 101 and 102
 Red Arrow, a limited dealer edition of the Saab 900

Places
 Red Arrow Camp, a boys camp in northern Wisconsin
 Red Arrow Park, a city park in Marinette, Wisconsin

Other
 The “Red Arrow Award“ of the Boy Scouts' Order of the Arrow
 The high school athletic Red Arrow Conference

See also
 “Red Tipped Arrow“ (Ihbudah Hishi), also known as Tex G. Hall
 Red Arrow, Black Shield, adventure module for D & D
 Arrow (disambiguation)
 Black Arrow (disambiguation)
 Blue Arrow (disambiguation)
 Golden Arrow (disambiguation)
 Green Arrow (disambiguation)
 Pink Arrow (disambiguation)
 Red Arrows (disambiguation)
 Silver Arrow (disambiguation)
 White Arrow (disambiguation)
 Yellow Arrow (disambiguation)